Lantadilla is a municipality located in the province of Palencia, Castile and León, Spain. According to the 2009 census (INE), the municipality has a population of 368 inhabitants.

References

External links
 
 
 Lantadilla home page

Municipalities in the Province of Palencia